Tiffany Cornelius (born 13 January 1989) is a Luxembourgish tennis player.

Cornelius has a career high WTA doubles ranking of 1155, achieved on 1 August 2011.

Cornelius represents Luxembourg in Fed Cup.

References

External links
 
 
 

1989 births
Living people
Luxembourgian female tennis players